Tendangan dari Langit is a 2011 Indonesian film directed by Hanung Bramantyo. This film stars Yosie Kristanto, Maudy Ayunda, and Joshua Suherman.

Cast

Production
Filming took place at several locations in Malang, including Gajayana Stadium in Gadingasri and Klojen.

Soundtrack
The soundtrack album, Ost. Tendangan Dari Langit, was produced by Warner Music Group and released in 2011. It contains five songs from the film, including the main theme song, "Tendangan Dari Langit", sung by Kotak. "Cinta Jangan Pergi" and "Energi" were also released as singles. Altogether the album contains 24 songs from 12 musical films. Twelve of the songs are sung by Kotak.

Awards and nominations

References

External links 
 (Indonesia) Website SinemArt

Indonesian drama films
2010s Indonesian-language films
Films directed by Hanung Bramantyo